Shirley Fry defeated Angela Buxton in the final, 6–3, 6–1 to win the ladies' singles tennis title at the 1956 Wimbledon Championships. Louise Brough was the defending champion, but lost in the semifinals to Fry.

Seeds

  Louise Brough (semifinals)
  Beverly Fleitz (quarterfinals)
  Angela Mortimer (quarterfinals)
  Althea Gibson (quarterfinals)
  Shirley Fry (champion)
  Angela Buxton (final)
  Dorothy Knode (second round)
  Shirley Bloomer (quarterfinals)

Draw

Finals

Top half

Section 1

Section 2

Section 3

Section 4

Bottom half

Section 5

Section 6

Section 7

Section 8

References

External links

Women's Singles
Wimbledon Championship by year – Women's singles
Wimbledon Championships
Wimbledon Championships